Juliette Bruno-Ruby was born as Juliette Henriette Marie Leclère on January 13, 1878, in Versailles and died on July 22, 1956, in Maisons-Laffitte. She was a novelist and film director.

Biography 
She was born to Adolphe Leclère, a recipient of the Legion of Honour. Juliette Leclère was married to Henri Bucquet, an attorney, in April 1896, before divorcing him in 1909. Later, in April 1913, she remarried, to Jean Vignaud, who she met in the Prix Excelsior literary contest in February 1912.

Her first novel, Madame Cotte, was published in 1913, where she first took the name pen-name of Bruno-Ruby. In 1923 she began work on her film La Caban d'amour, which released in Paris in August of the next year. Three years later, she directed the film La Bonne Hôtesse.

Selected works

Filmography

Awards and nominations 
Officier de l'Instruction publique (March 17, 1913)

References

External links 
 

1878 births
1956 deaths
French women film directors
20th-century French novelists
French women novelists
Officiers of the Ordre des Palmes Académiques